Mevlüt Uysal (born 1966, Alanya) is a Turkish politician and lawyer who was the mayor of Istanbul Metropolitan Municipality from September 2017 to April 2019.

After completing the primary and middle school in Antalya, he studied law at Istanbul University and graduated in 1988.

Uysal worked as a freelance lawyer and has been engaged in active politics. He co-founded the district organization of Justice and Development Party (AKP) in Küçükçekmece, Istanbul Province. Following the merger of Bahçeşehir and Başakşehir neighborhoods forming the Başakşehir district, he was elected district mayor of Başakşehir in the 2009 local elections on March 29. He was re-elected in the 2014 local elections.

He was nominated as the Mayor of Istanbul from the AKP after Mayor Kadir Topbaş resigned from his post on September 22, 2017. Uysal was elected the new mayor in the third round in the Council of Istanbul Metropolitan Municipality on September 28, 2017.

Uysal is married and father of four.

References

Living people
1966 births
People from Alanya
Istanbul University Faculty of Law alumni
20th-century Turkish lawyers
Mayors of places in Turkey
Mayors of Istanbul
Justice and Development Party (Turkey) politicians
21st-century Turkish politicians